Thibaut is a name of French origin, a form of Theobald.

Surname 
 Anton Friedrich Justus Thibaut (17721840), German jurist
 Bernhard Friedrich Thibaut (17751832), German mathematician
 François Thibaut (born 1948), American educator
 George Thibaut (18481914), German-born indologist
 Georges Pierre Thibaut (1920unknown), Belgian chess master
 Jean-Claude Thibaut (born 1968), French filmmaker, visual artist, and producer 
 John Thibaut (191786), American social psychologist
 Major Thibaut (born 1977), American politician in Louisiana
 Philippe Thibaut (active from 1993), French designer and producer of grand strategy video games
 Willem Thibaut, Tybaut, or Tibout (152497), Dutch painter

Personal name 
 Thibaut III (Theobald III, Count of Champagne, 11791201)
 Thibaut I (Theobald I of Navarre, 120153), King of Navarre, aka Theobald IV, Count of Champagne
 Thibaut de Blaison (died after March 1229), Poitevin nobleman, crusader, and trouvère
 Thibaut Courtois (born 1992), Belgian footballer
 Thibaut Detal (born 1985), Belgian footballer
 Thibaut Duval (born 1979), Belgian pole vaulter
 Thibaut Fauconnet (born 1985), French speed skater
 Thibaut de Longeville (born 1974), French self-taught writer, filmmaker, creative director, brand marketer and entrepreneur
 Thibaut Monnet (born 1982), Swiss ice hockey player
 Thibaut Pinot (born 1990), French road bicycle racer
 Thibaut Privat (born 1979), French rugby union player
 Thibaut de Reimpré (born 1949), French painter
 Thibaut Van Acker (born 1991), Belgian footballer
 Thibaut Vion (born 1993), French footballer
 Thibault Visensang (AKA Thibaut, born 1991), French rugby union player

See also
 Thibaud (disambiguation)
Thibault (disambiguation)
Thibeault (disambiguation)
Thiébaut (disambiguation)

French-language surnames
French masculine given names